Partido Federal ng Pilipinas (PFP) is a national political party in the Philippines. It is chaired by Bongbong Marcos, president of the Philippines who won by a landslide in the 2022 election. During the run-up to the 2022 general election, the UniTeam Alliance was formed by the PFP, Lakas–CMD, HNP, and PMP, with guest candidates from other parties.

PFP was formed in 2018 by supporters of President Rodrigo Duterte and calls for federalism in the Philippines.

History

Formation and early years: 2018–2021

The Partido Federal ng Pilipinas was formed in early 2018 by supporters of President Rodrigo Duterte, including the Mayor Rodrigo Roa Duterte-National Executive Coordinating Committee (MRRD-NECC), a group that supported his 2016 presidential campaign, as well as former members of PDP–Laban, Duterte's party. The party was formally accredited by the Commission on Elections (COMELEC) on October 5, 2018, and was approved as a national political party on November 5 that year. Former DILG undersecretary and MRRD-NECC member Jesus "Jayvee" Hinlo Jr. was the party's founding president, while Secretary of Agrarian Reform John Castriciones, also from the MRRD-NECC, is recognized as the party's founder. Castriciones succeeded Hinlo as party president when the latter decided to run for senator in the 2019 elections. PFP had also requested Duterte to be their chairman.

Notable politicians who ran under PFP in 2019 include E. R. Ejercito, Reynaldo Umali, Joy Belmonte, and Donya Tesoro. In that year's elections, 238 PFP members were elected to office, including six seats in the House of Representatives. Reynaldo Tamayo Jr., who was elected governor of South Cotabato, became the party's new president.

Bongbong Marcos era: 2021–present
In September 2021, the party unanimously nominated Bongbong Marcos as their presidential candidate for 2022. Marcos joined the party on October 5 and became their chairman. He filed his candidacy the following day. Having no official vice presidential candidate, PFP adopted Duterte's daughter, Davao City mayor Sara Duterte of Lakas–CMD, as Marcos' running mate. PFP, Lakas–CMD, Hugpong ng Pagbabago (HNP), and Pwersa ng Masang Pilipino (PMP) then formed the UniTeam Alliance.

In December 2021, a group claiming to be the real officers of PFP filed a disqualification case against Marcos. The group's leader, National Commission on Muslim Filipinos commissioner Abubakar Mangelen, who claims to be the true chairman of PFP, called Marcos' nomination "invalid and void", claiming that many party officers were not consulted or informed about it. Secretary-General Thompson Lantion claimed that Mangelen was ousted as chairman of the party during its last convention on September 18, 2021 and was replaced by Marcos with his consent, although Mangelen still remains as a member of the party. However, Mangelen denied the said claim and argued that he was the duly elected chairman of the party as shown in its petition for registration filed before the COMELEC and accused PFP members of unseating him as chairman without due process in order to make Marcos the leader of the party. On February 10, 2022, the COMELEC dismissed the case against the disqualification of Marcos for "lack of merit." On February 14, Mangelen filed a motion for reconsideration at COMELEC, which after an en banc review, was finally dismissed a day after the election.

On March 30, 2022, at a campaign rally in Iligan, the Mangelen-led faction endorsed the presidential campaign of Manila mayor Isko Moreno (Aksyon Demokratiko). The endorsement was affirmed and supported by Castriciones, now a PDP–Laban member, who was also present in the said campaign rally. Lantion of the Marcos-led faction condemned the Mangelen wing's endorsement as "irresponsible" and "fake," and called Mangelen an "impostor." However, Castriciones stood by Mangelen and called him the "true chairman." On April 19, the Mangelen-led faction changed their endorsement to Vice President Leni Robredo, calling her campaign "more formidable" to beat "the greatest threat to our country and our democracy, Ferdinand Marcos Jr."

On May 25, Bongbong Marcos and Sara Duterte were proclaimed winners by the Congress of the Philippines. It was the first time under the 1987 Constitution that the President and Vice President were elected by a majority of voters.

Ideology and political positions
PFP seeks to replace the Philippines' unitary system of government with a federalist government.

The party's general counsel, George Briones, describes PFP as "a party of the common man.... of the poor.... of the grassroots", and the party's dream is "a society that is free of illegal drugs, free of corruption, free of crime, free of insurgency and free of poverty." Party president Reynaldo Tamayo Jr. says the PFP's principles are: humanism, patriotic federalism, enlightened socialism, and direct democracy. He also declared that PFP "values human dignity and will aspire for equality among all Filipinos." The party's slogan is "a life worthy of human dignity for every Filipino."

The PFP- International Affairs Committee presented a long-term plan for Overseas Filipino Workers (OFW) that includes skills training, benefits, retirement plans, health insurance, scholarship grants, and other support services.

Political scientist Julio C. Teehankee classifies PFP as one of the neo-authoritarian parties that spawned during the presidency of Rodrigo Duterte.

Organization and structure
The party claims to have a total of 1.5 million members nationwide as of September 2021.

Party leadership

As of October 5, 2021 (Marcos) and September 18, 2021 (other officers).

Party presidents
Jesus "Jayvee" Hinlo Jr. (2018)
John Castriciones (2018–2019)
Reynaldo Tamayo Jr. (2019–present)

Electoral performance

Presidential elections

Vice presidential elections

Senate elections

House of Representatives elections

Current members

National government officials

Members of the House of Representatives

Local government officials

Others
 ER Ejercito – former governor of Laguna (2010–2014)
 Imelda Papin – former vice governor of Camarines Sur (2019–2022)

See also 
Federalism in the Philippines
Federalism and Rodrigo Duterte

Federalist parties in the Philippines:
 Hugpong sa Tawong Lungsod
 Lakas-CMD
 PDP-Laban
 Pederalismo ng Dugong Dakilang Samahan
 UniTeam

Notes

References

External links 

Political parties established in 2018
2018 establishments in the Philippines
Centrist parties in the Philippines
Presidency of Rodrigo Duterte
Federalism in the Philippines
Federalist parties